Chet Atkins Picks on the Beatles  is the twenty-eighth studio album by American guitarist Chet Atkins. Atkins interprets a selection of songs by The Beatles on this album.

History
The sleeve features liner notes by George Harrison and there is a photo of Atkins wearing a "Beatle wig" on the back cover. It peaked at No. 6 on the Billboard Country Albums charts and No. 112 on the Pop Albums charts.

Atkins never recorded with the Gretsch Country Gentleman 12-string guitar that was made especially for him and is pictured on the cover.

The recording was nominated for Best Instrumental Recording (other than Jazz) at the 1967 Grammy awards.

Reception

Writing for Allmusic, critic Stephen Thomas Erlewine called the album "an entertaining, if ultimately disposable, artifact... As always, his playing is subtle and tasteful, but the album doesn't provide enough inventive or energetic performances to be of lasting interest." Norm Rosenfield of Country Standard Time wrote "You don't have to be a guitar fan to enjoy Atkins' arrangements that add unexpected harmonies with generous helpings of class. So when Chet picks on the Beatles it's only the highest form of flattery."

Reissues
 Chet Atkins Picks on The Beatles was issued on compact disc on 30 January 1996 (RCA 07863 53531-2).

Track listing
All songs by John Lennon and Paul McCartney

Side one
 "I Feel Fine” – 1:57
 "Yesterday” – 3:09
 “If I Fell” – 2:11
 “Can’t Buy Me Love” – 2:31
 “I'll Cry Instead” – 2:36
 “Things We Said Today” – 2:34

Side two
 “A Hard Day's Night” – 2:27
 “I'll Follow the Sun” – 2:06
 “She's a Woman” – 2:40
 “And I Love Her” – 2:22
 “Michelle” – 2:46
 “She Loves You” – 2:34

Personnel
Chet Atkins – guitar
Charlie McCoy - harmonica

References

1966 albums
Chet Atkins albums
Albums produced by Chet Atkins
Albums produced by Bob Ferguson (music)
The Beatles tribute albums
RCA Victor albums